Tootsie Guevarra (born Emma Theresa Pinga, August 17, 1980) is a former recording artist, actress, and television host. 
She later graduated in 2003 in Hotel Restaurant and Management from Quezon City and married her Filipino-American husband in Manila in 2005. They later moved to America where they went on to have a son but eventually separated. During an interview with TFC's Balitang America, it was revealed that she now works as a marketing executive in the healthcare industry and has since remarried in 2012 to Mike Monaco, an Italian-American. The couple were also expecting their first child within two months. On October 11, 2014, she appeared as a guest on ASAP's concert in Los Angeles to perform her hit songs while being accompanied by Toni and Alex Gonzaga. This marked her first television performance since her retirement from showbusiness. In 2018, she released a song titled "Iisa Lang" under composer Vehnee Saturno's music label marking her first music release since returning into the music industry.

Discography

Albums

Compilation appearances

References

External links
 Official Website of Tootsie Guevarra

1980 births
Living people
Filipino child singers
Singers from Manila
21st-century Filipino singers
That's Entertainment Monday Group Members
That's Entertainment (Philippine TV series)
GMA Network personalities
ABS-CBN personalities
Star Magic